Monomorium is a genus of ants in the subfamily Myrmicinae. As of 2013 it contains about 396 species. It is distributed around the world, with many species native to the Old World tropics. It is considered to be "one of the more important groups of ants," considering its widespread distribution, its diversity, and its variety of morphological and biological characteristics. It also includes several familiar pest species, such as the pharaoh ant (M. pharaonis) and the flower ant (M. floricola).

Description
This genus is very diverse in morphology, with species of many shapes and sizes that "do not necessarily even remotely resemble one another" at first glance.

In certain species, the worker caste is monomorphic, whereas in others, it is polymorphic. In some species the workers are minute, in others they are rather large. Large, multifaceted eyes are common, but M. inusuale has much reduced eyes, as do some species from Africa. The sting is always functional.

Taxonomy
This large genus was further expanded in 2007, when the genera Nothidris, Epelysidris, and Phacota were synonymized with Monomorium. The small genera Anillomyrma, Megalomyrmex, and perhaps Bondroita should possibly also be included in Monomorium.

The exact boundaries of the genus are yet to be determined. It has no distinct morphological trait that sets it apart from other genera in the tribe Solenopsidini. If cladistics were strictly applied, all Solenopsidini would be grouped in the single genus Solenopsis, but the tribe lacks a strong synapomorphy. Monomorium as it currently stands is paraphyletic, but it is used as a provisional group. Similar problems are found in the genera Camponotus and Leptothorax.

Biology
Most ants of this genus nest in rotting wood, under rocks, or in the soil. Some species are scavengers, while others are seed collectors. Many species have venom containing alkaloids, which they use as a defense from predators. Besides its morphological variation, the genus is also variable in chromosome number, with 2n of 16 to 70 recorded.

Distribution
As of 2006, 36 species are described from Madagascar, 19 of which were described in that year alone. About 43 species are known from Australia and 30 from Arabia.

Selected species

 Monomorium antarcticum
 Monomorium bidentatum
 Monomorium chinense
 Monomorium delabiei Fernández, 2007
 Monomorium dentatum
 Monomorium denticulatum
 Monomorium effractor
 Monomorium fieldi
 Monomorium floricola – flower ant
 Monomorium hospitum
 Monomorium inquilinum
 Monomorium inusuale Fernández, 2007
 Monomorium kondratieffi Sharaf & Aldawood, 2013
 Monomorium minimum – little black ant
 Monomorium monomorium Bolton, 1987
 Monomorium noualhieri
 Monomorium pergandei
 Monomorium pharaonis – pharaoh ant
 Monomorium rubriceps
 Monomorium santschii
 Monomorium smithi
 Monomorium talbotae

References

External links
Monomorium. Japanese Ant Image Database.

Further reading

Mayr, G. (1855). Formicina austriaca. Beschreibung der bisher im oesterreichischen Kaiserstaate aufgefundenen Ameisen nebst Hinzufuegung jener in Deutschland, in der Schweiz und in Italien vorkommenden Ameisen. Verhandlungen des Zoologisch-Botanischen Vereins in Wien 5, 273-478.

 
Ant genera
Taxa named by Gustav Mayr
Taxonomy articles created by Polbot